Claude is a surname. It may refer to :
 Albert Claude (1899–1983), a Belgian Nobel Prize in Medicine recipient
 Bonivert Claude (born 1945), a Former Bank of Haïti governor
 François Auguste Claude (1858–1938), French astronomer
 Georges Claude (1870–1960), a French engineer, chemist and inventor
 Jean Claude (1619–1687), a French Protestant theologian

 Marcel Claude (born 1957), a Chilean economist, politician, and candidate for President of his country

Surnames